The 2008 Midas 400 was the fifth round of the 2008 V8 Supercar season. It was held on the weekend of 7 to 9 June Sandown Raceway in Melbourne, Victoria. With most states of Australia celebrating a public holiday on the Monday celebrating the Queen's birthday, the meeting took the unusual format of Saturday-Monday instead of Friday-Sunday.

Practice 
Qualifying was held on Saturday 7 June. Following on from the Eastern Creek round of the series, a 'rookie' practice session was held, allowing younger and newer drivers to gain additional testing laps. Teams were also allowed to use the session to test their co-drivers who will step into the teams for the Phillip Island 500 and Bathurst 1000 races later in the season which require two drivers per car. Of the enduro co-drivers, Steve Owen was fastest driving for Jim Beam Racing. Paul Radisich (HSV Dealer Team) was second fastest ahead of Jason Bargwanna (Rod Nash Racing). Other co-drivers to take part, in order were John McIntyre (Glenfords Racing), Warren Luff (Jim Beam Racing), Dean Canto (Ford Performance Racing), Craig Baird and Glenn Seton (both Holden Racing Team), David Besnard (Stone Brothers Racing), Greg Ritter (Garry Rogers Motorsport), Dale Wood (Tasman Motorsport), Paul Weel (Paul Weel Racing), Nathan Pretty (Jack Daniel's Racing), Brad Jones (Brad Jones Racing), Jack Perkins (Jack Daniel's Racing), Luke Youlden (Ford Performance Racing) and Grant Denyer (Ford Rising Stars Racing).

Fastest driver of the day was Garth Tander, the only driver to lap faster than Owen. James Courtney, Mark Winterbottom and Jamie Whincup were the only drivers within a tenth of Owen's best lap.

Qualifying 
Qualifying was held on Sunday 8 June. Jamie Whincup slammed home pole position in the final moments of qualifying, some four-tenths clear of the field. Mark Winterbottom was second fastest, leading Will Davison and leading Holden, Rick Kelly by only a few hundredths of a second. Fabian Coulthard had a best ever qualifying result to be fifth fastest with Russell Ingall also well up in sixth, 19 grid spots ahead of his teammate. Handling issues slowed the Holden Racing Team, both Garth Tander and Mark Skaife missing the cut for the top ten.

Race 1 
Race 1 was held on Sunday 8 June. Steven Richards and Todd Kelly tangled on the opening lap, Greg Murphy spun on the second lap, all three dropping to the tail of the field. Andrew Thompson spun Marcus Marshall around at the top of the straight. Will Davison retired from the race in the early running with an engine problem, spoiling the good work from qualifying. Craig Lowndes damaged his car trying to get past Davison. Rick Kelly had lurid 160 km/h spin in the Esses without hitting the walls or the cars in close company, only losing three spots.

As the race settled Whincup pulled further and further away, only Winterbottom was able to hang on to finish second. Craig Lowndes fought his way into third position. Russell Ingall took his best finish of the season to finish top Holden in fourth ahead of Garth Tander, recovering from a poor grid position. Coulthard finished eighth, capitalising on his qualifying performance. Shane van Gisbergen finished an excellent ninth.

Race 2 
Race 2 was held on Monday 9 June.

Race 3 
Race 3 was held on Monday 9 June.

Results
Results as follows:

Qualifying

Race 1 results

Race 2 results

Race 3 results

Standings
After round 5 of 14.

Support categories
The 2008 Midas 400 had four support categories.

References

External links
Official timing and results

Midas 400
Motorsport at Sandown